Kirloskarvadi railway station is one of the important railway station in Palus, Sangli district, Maharashtra and on Central Railway line. Station code is KOV. It serves for Kirloskarvadi town and connectivity station for Palus–Tasgaon–Islmapur–Vita-Karad Talukas. The station consists of two platforms with completed electrification.  The first electric train is expected to run on this line from Kolhapur to Mumbai by December 2021,trial run is completed on this line. The station is opposite the largest industrial township of Kirloskar Group. Famous Datta Maharaj Holy place Audhumbar is just 11 km away. Sagareshwar Wild Life Sanctuary is just 5 km from Kirloskarvadi station. There are trains to major cities like Pune, Mumbai, Delhi, Ahmedabad, Vadodara, Bhopal, Belgaum, Hubli, Jodhpur, Lonavala, Guntakal, Rajkot, Gandhidham, Goa and Bangalore.

The Railway station is one of the hangout places for wadikars during the evenings. The station is well cleaned and maintained. The staffs since many years have been very helpful.

Trains 
 Goa Express
 16209 Mysore–Ajmer Express
 16531 Ajmer–Bangalore City Garib Nawaz Express
 Gandhidham Express
 16507/16508 Jodhpur–Bangalore City Express (via Hubballi)
 16534/KSR Jodhpur–Bangalore City Express (via Guntakal))
 LTT-Dadar–Hubli Express
 Koyna Express
 Mahalaxmi Express
 Maharashtra Express
 Sahyadri Express

References

Railway stations in Sangli district
Pune railway division